The following rail lines are known as the Chicago Line:
Conrail's Chicago Line, Chicago to Albany, now the following Norfolk Southern and CSX lines:
Chicago Line (Norfolk Southern), Chicago to Cleveland
Cleveland Terminal Subdivision (CSX), Cleveland
Erie West Subdivision (CSX), Cleveland to Erie
Lake Shore Subdivision (CSX), Erie to Buffalo
Rochester Subdivision (CSX), Buffalo to Syracuse
Mohawk Subdivision (CSX), Syracuse to Amsterdam
part of the Selkirk Subdivision (CSX), Amsterdam to Hoffmans
part of the Hudson Subdivision (CSX), Hoffmans to Albany